This is a list of episodes of the 2013 Japanese tokusatsu television series Garo: Yami o Terasu Mono, the sequel to 2005 & 2006's Garo.

Episodes


{| class="wikitable" width="98%"
|- style="border-bottom:8px solid black;"
! style="width:4%;"| # !! Title !! Writer !! Original airdate
|-| colspan="4" style="background:#e6e9ff;"|

 Ryuga 

|-| colspan="4" style="background:#e6e9ff;"|

 Gold wave 

|-| colspan="4" style="background:#e6e9ff;"|

 Dungeon 

|-| colspan="4" style="background:#e6e9ff;"|

 Dream 

|-| colspan="4" style="background:#e6e9ff;"|

 Nightmare 

|-| colspan="4" style="background:#e6e9ff;"|

 Rock 

|-| colspan="4" style="background:#e6e9ff;"|

 Dining 

|-| colspan="4" style="background:#e6e9ff;"|

 Scoop 

|-| colspan="4" style="background:#e6e9ff;"|

 Sonshi 

|-| colspan="4" style="background:#e6e9ff;"|

 Promise 

|-| colspan="4" style="background:#e6e9ff;"|

 Desire 

|-| colspan="4" style="background:#e6e9ff;"|

 Trap 

|-| colspan="4" style="background:#e6e9ff;"|

 Hunting 

|-| colspan="4" style="background:#e6e9ff;"|

 Hyena 

|-| colspan="4" style="background:#e6e9ff;"|

 Hint 

|-| colspan="4" style="background:#e6e9ff;"|

 Lost 

|-|colspan="4" bgcolor="#e6e9ff"|

 Tousei 

|-|colspan="4" bgcolor="#e6e9ff"|

 War 

|-|colspan="4" bgcolor="#e6e9ff"|

 Hope 

|-|colspan="4" bgcolor="#e6e9ff"|

 Mother 

|-|colspan="4" bgcolor="#e6e9ff"|

 Justice 

|-|colspan="4" bgcolor="#e6e9ff"|

 Master 

|-|colspan="4" bgcolor="#e6e9ff"|

 Gold 

|-|colspan="4" bgcolor="#e6e9ff"|

 Future 

|-|colspan="4" bgcolor="#e6e9ff"|

 Beginning 

|}

References

Yami o Terasu Mono episodes
Garo Yami o Terasu Mono